Ziaabad (also Romanized as Ẕīā’ābād and Ẕīāābād; also known as Deh Sefīd) is a village in Astaneh Rural District, in the Central District of Shazand County, Markazi Province, Iran. At the 2006 census, its population was 621, in 141 families.

References 

Populated places in Shazand County